The commune of Kayogoro is a commune of Makamba Province in southern Burundi. The capital lies at Kayogoro.

References

Communes of Burundi
Makamba Province